Private credit is an asset defined by non-bank lending where the debt is not issued or traded on the public markets. Private credit can also be referred to as "direct lending" or "private lending". It is a subset of "alternative credit".

The private credit market has shifted away from banks in recent decades. In 1994, U.S. bank underwriting covered over 70 percent of middle market loans. By 2020, U.S. banks issued/held around 10 percent of middle market loans.  Direct lending market expanded rapidly in the wake of the 2008 financial crises when the SEC tightened restrictions and capital requirements on public banks. As banks decreased their lending activity, nonbank lenders took their place to address the continued demand for debt financing from corporate borrowers.  

Private Credit has been one of the fastest-growing asset classes. By 2017, private debt fundraising exceeded $100B. One factor for the rapid growth has been investor demand. As of 2018, returns were averaging 8.1% IRR across all  private credit strategies with some strategies yielding as high as 14% IRR.  At the same time, supply has increased as companies have turned to non-bank lenders after the financial crisis due to stricter lending requirements.

One recent trend has been the rise of covenant-lite loans (which is also an issue for publicly traded investment grade and high yield debt). This has been driven by investor demand for the relatively high yield compared to alternatives and a willingness to accept less protections. This has resulted in fewer company restrictions and fewer investors' rights if the company struggles. That being said, for the investment firms, covenant-lite loans can also be helpful because of the negative optics if a portfolio company goes into default, and fewer restrictions means fewer ways a company can go into default.

Role of BDCs 
In addition to private funds, much of the capital for private debt comes from business development companies (BDCs). BDCs were created by Congress in 1980 as closed-end funds regulated under the Investment Company Act of 1940 to provide small and growing companies access to capital and to enable private equity funds to access public capital markets. Under the legislation, a BDC must invest at least 70% of its assets in nonpublic US companies with market value less than $250M. Moreover, like REITs, as long as 90% or more of the BDC’s income was distributed to investors, the BDC would not be taxed at the corporate level. While BDCs are allowed to invest anywhere in the capital structure, the vast majority of the investment has been debt because BDCs typically lever their equity with debt (up to 2X their equity), and fixed income investing supports their debt obligations.  With regards to size of the market, as of June 2021, BDC assets totaled $156 billion from 79 funds.

Public equity investing in private credit
Over 70% of the investor capital for private credit comes from institutional investors.

For non-institutional investors looking to invest in private capital, few options exist because most of the investment vehicles are private and limited to qualified investors ($5M or more liquid net worth). As of June 2021, 57% of the BDC market was publicly traded BDCs where retail investors can invest.

References 

Banking
Credit